Dana Hamilton (born November 17, 1950 in Arlington, Texas) is an American hammered dulcimer player.

Hamilton won first place in the 1980 and 1989 Walnut Valley National Hammered Dulcimer Championships held in Winfield, Kansas. He is the only two-time national champion in the history of this competition. He also won the 1995 National Mountain Duclimer Championship. In 2005, he was a finalist in the International Autoharp Contest. He often performs with the Sweet Song String Band.

Discography
 Cold Frosty Morn with the Sweet Song String Band
 One Hot Texas Night with the Sweet Song String Band
 Barn Dance with the Sweet Song String Band
 The New Dallas String Band with the New Dallas String Band
 Blackbottom Strut Dana Hamilton and friends
 Loose Change with Loose Change
 Loose Change: A Collection of Traditional Instrumentals with Loose Change
 No Audible Dialog with Shawn Tutt

References

External links
 Sweet Song String Band's website

Hammered dulcimer players
Musicians from Texas
1950 births
Living people